Henry Martyn Scudder (5 February 1822 – 4 June 1895) was a missionary under American Board of Commissioners for Foreign Missions and Board of Foreign Missions of the Reformed Church in America to Japan and South India—to American Madura Mission and American Madras Mission. He established American Arcot Mission, North Arcot of South India—then under Madras Presidency.

Biography

He was born at Panditeripo, Ceylon, on 5 February 1822. He was the eldest son of John Scudder, Sr., the first American medical missionary to India and second missionary to American Madras Mission at Madras—Sr.Scudder arrived at Madras Mission in September 1836, while Miron Winslow commenced it in August 1836 after East India Company opened India in 1833 to missionaries of all lands, including non-British missionaries. Henry joined his father as a missionary at Madras in 1844.

He went to the United States in 1832, and graduated at the University of the City of New York in 1840 and Union Theological Seminary. He was ordained by American Board of Commissioners for Foreign Missions(ABCFM) in 1843.  The following year he was sent as an ABCFM missionary to Madura, India, where he labored from 1844 to 1846, and in 1846 to Madras, where he labored until 1850. After his arrival to Madras from United States, he studied medicine at Madras Medical College, in addition to his missionary activity. Later, he received his M.D degree from New York University.  In 1850, he founded the mission American Arcot Mission for the board of the Dutch Reformed Church  at Arcot, where he labored until 1864. After being a missionary under ABCM until 1857, he served as a missionary under the Board of Foreign Missions of the Reformed Church in America after 1857.

In 1864, his health failing in the climate of India, he returned to America, and he became a pastor of a church in San Francisco. He held pastorates at Jersey City, New Jersey; Brooklyn, New York; and Chicago, Illinois. He built churches in Brooklyn and Chicago, and engaged in pastoral work for nearly 20 years. From 1887 to 1889 he was in the mission field in Japan. He died on 4 June 1895 in Winchester, Massachusetts.

North Arcot Mission
In 1850, Henry Scudder having toured the neighbouring districts along with John Dulles of Arcot found that the million and a half souls never heard of Jesus Christ; hence, he sought and obtained the permission from British Raj to make the city of Arcot as the centre of a new mission in the northern districts of Arcot. The father and son opened a mission in the Arcot district, 80 miles west of Madras, as a chief station of North Arcot Mission. The mission was opened to introduce Western medical science among the natives (Tamil people) of the districts. The then-British Madras Government of Madras Presidency gave him a building, ample land for the construction of hospital, and contributed its expenses. Initially, when no house was available for residence, he took a rented house at Wallajanagar and opened a dispensary with the purpose of winning a favourable entrance for the gospel. On 31 May 1853, Henry and William Waterbury Scudder met together in Arcot, and drew up the charter of the American Arcot Mission. Very soon, nine children  and nine grandchildren Sr. Scudder were associated with that mission—like W.W. Scudder, E.C. Scudder, J.W. Scudder, John Scudder, S.D. Scudder, and many more. He was among the Scudders in India who devoted more than 1,100 combined years to Christian mission service by 42 members of four generations of the family. In 1853, he together with his brother and father, requested particular Synod of New York City to approve their being organized into the Classis of Arcot. This charter was in accord with the action of the Board of Foreign Missions of the Reformed Church General Synod in 1852. Having received the permission of the particular Synod, they formed the Classis in 1854—the first and only classis of the Reformed church outside North America continent.

Bibliography

He published a number of books in the Sanskrit, Tamil, and Telugu languages. With excellent command in Tamil language, he published Spiritual Teaching, The Bazaar Book, and Jewel Mine of Salvation that had become valuable aid to missionaries and native preachers—These are still used in Arcot districts. He also made the translation of liturgy into Tamil.

References

American Protestant missionaries
Protestant missionaries in India
New York University Grossman School of Medicine alumni
1822 births
1895 deaths
Union Theological Seminary (New York City) alumni
People from Northern Province, Sri Lanka
Sri Lankan people of American descent
American expatriates in India